Kōyō, Koyo or Kouyou (written: 光洋, 光陽, 紅葉, 紅陽, 晃洋, 浩陽 or 昂洋) is a masculine Japanese given name. Notable people with the name include:

, Japanese baseball player
, Japanese photographer
, Japanese astronomer
, American sumo wrestler
, Japanese photographer
, Japanese writer
, Japanese footballer

Japanese masculine given names